Lithuania competed at the 2012 Summer Olympics in London, from 27 July to 12 August 2012. This was the nation's eighth appearance at the Summer Olympics. The National Olympic Committee of Lithuania (LTOK) sent a total of 62 athletes to the Games, 39 men and 23 women, to compete in 14 sports. Men's basketball was the only team-based sport in which Lithuania had its representation in these Olympic games.

The Lithuanian team featured past Olympic medalists, including Laser Radial sailor and world champion Gintarė Scheidt, who previously won the silver in Beijing. Trap shooter Daina Gudzinevičiūtė, and discus thrower and two-time Olympic champion Virgilijus Alekna, who became Lithuania's flag bearer at the opening ceremony, made their fifth Olympic appearance as the oldest and most experienced team members. Basketball player Šarūnas Jasikevičius and heptathlete Austra Skujytė, on the other hand, were among the Lithuanian athletes to compete in four Olympic games. Other notable athletes featured swimmer and world bronze medalist Giedrius Titenis, and NBA basketball stars Linas Kleiza and Jonas Valančiūnas (both played for the Toronto Raptors).

Lithuania left London with a total of six Olympic medals (two gold, one silver, and three bronze). Four of these medals were awarded for the first time in boxing, canoeing and swimming, including all gold medals won by women. Among the nation's medalists were 15-year-old breaststroke swimmer Rūta Meilutytė, the youngest athlete of the team, who surprisingly won Lithuania's first ever gold medal in her sport, and Laura Asadauskaitė, who became the final Olympic champion in London, after winning the women's modern pentathlon. The men's national basketball team failed to advance into the semi-finals for the first time, after losing out to Russia.

Medalists

| width="78%" align="left" valign="top" |

| width="22%" align="left" valign="top" |

Competitors

Athletics

Lithuanian athletes have so far achieved qualifying standards in the following athletics events (up to a maximum of 3 athletes in each event at the 'A' Standard, and 1 at the 'B' Standard):

Men
Track & road events

Field events

Combined events – Decathlon

Women
Track & road events

Field events

Combined events – Heptathlon

Badminton

Basketball

Men's tournament

Roster

Group play

Quarter-final

Boxing

Men

Canoeing

Sprint
Lithuania has so far qualified boats for the following events:

 On 12 June 2019, the IOC stripped Jevgenijus Šuklinas of his silver medal.
Qualification Legend: FA = Qualify to final (medal); FB = Qualify to final B (non-medal);

Cycling

Road

Track
Sprint

Keirin

BMX

Gymnastics

Artistic
Men

Women

Judo

Modern pentathlon

Rowing

Men

Women

Qualification Legend: FA=Final A (medal); FB=Final B (non-medal); FC=Final C (non-medal); FD=Final D (non-medal); FE=Final E (non-medal); FF=Final F (non-medal); SA/B=Semifinals A/B; SC/D=Semifinals C/D; SE/F=Semifinals E/F; Q=Quarterfinals; R=Repechage

Sailing

Men

Women

M = Medal race;  EL = Eliminated – did not advance into the medal race;

Shooting 

Women

Swimming

Men

Women

Wrestling 

Men's Greco-Roman

References

Nations at the 2012 Summer Olympics
2012
2012 in Lithuanian sport